Gershon (Hebrew: גֵּרְשׁוֹן‎) was the oldest son of Levi in the Torah.

Gershon may also refer to:

 Gersonides (1288–1344), French rabbi also known as Levi ben Gershon
 Gershon Review (2004–2005), a review of efficiency in the UK public sector

People with the surname
 Amit Gershon (born 1995), Israeli basketball player 
 Pini Gershon (born 1951), Israeli basketball player and coach
 Gina Gershon (born 1962), American actress; not to be confused with pornographic actress Gina Gerson (born 1991)
 Grant Gershon (born 1960), American pianist, conductor, chorus master
 Michael D. Gershon, American neurobiologist and author of The Second Brain
 Nina Gershon (born 1940), American jurist
 Peter Gershon (born 1947), British business executive and civil servant
 Yitzhak Gershon (born 1958), Israeli general

People with the given name
 Gershon Agron (1894–1959), mayor of Jerusalem (1955–59)
 Gershon Ben-Shakhar (born 1942), Israeli psychologist and former President of the Open University of Israel
 Gershon Kingsley (1922–2019), German-American composer
 Gershon Legman (1917–1999), American folklorist
 Ted "Kid" Lewis (born Gershon Mendeloff; 1893–1970), English world champion Hall of Fame welterweight boxer
 Gershon Sirota (1874–1943), Polish cantor

See also
 Gershom (disambiguation)
 Gerson (disambiguation)

Hebrew-language surnames